The L. S. Starrett Company is an American manufacturer of tools and instruments used by machinists, tool and die makers, and the construction industry. The company was founded by businessman and inventor Laroy Sunderland Starrett in 1880. The company patented such items as the sliding combination square, bench vises, and a shoe hook fastener. It makes precision steel rules and tapes, calipers, micrometers, and dial indicators, among others. In addition, Starrett manufacturers a wide variety of saw products including bandsaws, hole saws, jigsaws, amongst other power tool accessories and cutting tools. More recently, they have expanded their high-end metrology equipment solutions including optical comparators, vision systems, laser measurement, force and material measurement testing. 

Starrett employs about 2,000 people worldwide, and the company claimed (as of 2008) to be the last remaining full-line precision tool company to be manufacturing their products within the United States. If so, much of the firm's manufacturing nevertheless takes place at facilities in the People's Republic of China, Brazil, Germany, and the UK, with 28% of Starrett's worldwide sales being in Brazil in 2013.

History

The Starrett corporation has continuously expanded through its history through the patenting of products and takeovers of other manufacturers. In 1878 Laroy S. Starrett invented and patented the first combination square, and in 1880 he founded the L.S. Starrett Company in Athol, Massachusetts, in order to produce it and other precision tools. In 1882, Starrett traveled to London and Paris to appoint sales representatives, thereby starting up the international marketing of his products.  In 1887, Starrett acquired further patents.

In 1890, L.S. Starrett patented a micrometer with other improvements, transforming the rough version of this tool into a modern micrometer. During the same year Starrett began making and refining saw blades, and continues to be a major manufacturer as of 2015. In 1895 Starrett patented the divider with trammel. In 1920, the company added its first gauge to the product line and quickly became the world’s largest innovator and maker of precision calibrators.

Between 1941 and 1945, Starrett increased its production by 800%   and won the Army- Navy “E” Award.   At the same time, more than 400 employees went into the US armed forces. The post-war period was a time of overseas expansion, with Starrett opening a factory in São Paulo, Brazil, in 1956. In the early 1970s, the Brazilian factory was moved to a new location in the city of Itu, 100 km from São Paulo.

In 1958, a plant was opened in Scotland, which currently makes products for the European and Asian markets. In 1962, Starrett acquired the Webber Gage Company, adding gauge blocks to the Starrett product line. In 1970, Starrett took over the Herman Stone Co., a granite product maker, and in 1985 it relocated production to a new plant in Mount Airy, North Carolina. This plant also makes saws and measuring equipment.

In 1986, Starrett took over the Evans Rule Company, the world's largest tape measure manufacturer, and in 1990 the company bought Sigma Optical, a British manufacturer of optical profile projectors. In 1998, Starrett expanded into China, opening a new plant in Suzhou.

In 2002, a former Starrett subcontractor alerted US Defense Department investigators to an alleged fraud issue with a Starrett RapidCheck Coordinate Measuring Machine that Starrett had to replace free-of-charge to customers because of a fault.  Federal agents raided Starrett's North Carolina plant looking for evidence of fraud. The federal investigation was terminated in December 2003 with no charges filed. In 2005, Starrett stopped manufacturing Coordinate Measuring Machines when it sold the CMM product division to the company Sheffield Measurement.

In 2006, L.S. Starrett Co. purchased Tru-Stone Technologies Inc. in Waite Park, Minnesota, a maker of custom-engineered granite machine bases, for $19.8 million in cash.

The current President and CEO of the company is Douglas A Starrett.

Gallery

References

External links

Companies listed on the New York Stock Exchange
Companies based in Massachusetts
Instrument-making corporations
Athol, Massachusetts